Glaucostola guttipalpis is a moth of the family Erebidae first described by Francis Walker in 1856. It is found in French Guiana, Guyana, Brazil, Ecuador and Costa Rica.

References

Phaegopterina
Moths of South America
Moths of Central America
Moths described in 1856